Behind the Wall: Bubba Wallace is an American reality show series that premiered on February 15, 2018 on Facebook Watch. It follows NASCAR driver Bubba Wallace as he prepares to compete in his first Daytona 500.

Premise
Behind the Wall: Bubba Wallace follows "Wallace’s road to the Daytona International Speedway, from his earliest racing days to his debut in the Monster Energy NASCAR Cup Series as the new full-time driver of the No. 43 Chevrolet Camaro ZL1 for Richard Petty Motorsports."

Production

Development
On February 13, 2018, it was announced that Facebook Watch had ordered a first season of Behind the Wall: Bubba Wallace, a new reality series featuring NASCAR driver Bubba Wallace. It was reported that Facebook was producing the series with NASCAR Productions in association with NASCAR Digital Media.

Marketing
Simultaneously with the initial series announcement, Facebook released a trailer for the first season of the show.

Episodes

See also
 List of original programs distributed by Facebook Watch

References

External links

Facebook Watch original programming
2010s American reality television series
2018 American television series debuts
2018 American television series endings
English-language television shows
American non-fiction web series